This is a list of films which have placed number one at the box office in Italy during 1995. Amounts are in lire.

Number one films

Highest-grossing films

See also
 Lists of box office number-one films

References

Chronology

1995
Italy
Box